Historia de un cobarde (English: History of a Coward) is a Mexican telenovela produced by Ernesto Alonso for Telesistema Mexicano in 1964.

Héctor Gómez and Alicia Montoyastar as the protagonists, Miguel Ángel Ferriz star as the antagonist.

Synopsis 
The story revolves around the life of a man who must break all ties involving it to be suspect in a crime.

Cast 
 Héctor Gómez
 Alicia Montoya
 Miguel Ángel Ferriz
 Irma Lozano
 Bertha Moss
 Julio Monterde
 Joaquín Cordero
 Francisco Jambrina

References

External links 

Mexican telenovelas
1964 telenovelas
Televisa telenovelas
1964 Mexican television series debuts
1964 Mexican television series endings
Spanish-language telenovelas